Cyrtodactylus fraenatus (bridled bent-toed gecko, Sri Lanka bent-toed gecko) is a species of gecko endemic to the island of Sri Lanka.

Habitat and distribution
Cyrtodactylus fraenatus is a large forest gecko from the midhills of Sri Lanka. Known localities include Peradeniya, Gampola, Menikdena and Hakgala Strict Nature Reserve.

Description
The head is large and broad. The tail is long, slender and longer than head-body length. Dorsal scales across mid-body between mid-ventral folds 35. Males with 4–6 pre-anal pores arranged at a wide angle.
The dorsum is olive-brown or chocolate brown, with 4–5 large, W-shaped marks.

Ecology and diet
It inhabits trees and other arboreal perches within forested habitats. Nocturnal, and also known to bask in direct sunlight.

Reproduction
2 eggs measuring 15 * 17 mm are produced at a time.

References

 http://reptile-database.reptarium.cz/species?genus=Cyrtodactylus&species=fraenatus
 https://web.archive.org/web/20140714220720/http://www.wht.lk/storage/miscellaneous/Cyrtodactylus%20RBZ.pdf
 http://animaldiversity.ummz.umich.edu/accounts/Cyrtodactylus_fraenatus/classification/

Reptiles of Sri Lanka
Cyrtodactylus
Reptiles described in 1864
Taxa named by Albert Günther